The 1926–27 Northern Football League season was the 34th in the history of the Northern Football League, a football competition in Northern England.

Clubs

The league featured 13 clubs which competed in the last season, along with one new club:
 Whitby United

League table

References

1926-27
4